Abacetus elongellus is a species of ground beetle in the subfamily Pterostichinae. It was described by Straneo in 1946.

References

elongellus
Beetles described in 1946